Carl Brenders (born 1937) is a naturalist and painter, born near Antwerp, Belgium. The painter is most famous for his detailed and lifelike paintings of wildlife.
  
Some of the artist's accomplishments include illustrations of wildlife for La Vie secrète des bêtes, a book series (published in English as Nature's Hidden World), and being named the 24th Master Artist at the 2002 Birds in Art Exhibition at Leigh Yawkey Woodson Art Museum in Wausau, Wisconsin. His art is the subject of the books, Wildlife: The Nature Paintings of Carl Brenders, Song of Creation, and Pride of Place: The Art of Carl Brenders.

30 of the artist's works were a part of the major retrospective exhibition Artistry in Nature: The Wildlife Paintings of Carl Brenders which opened at the Carnegie Museum of Natural History in Pittsburgh, Pennsylvania, and then traveled to Cleveland, Ohio, Louisville, Kentucky, and Shreveport, Louisiana.

Carl and his wife Paula make their home in Antwerp. They travel yearly to America for fieldwork while attending Birds in Art.

An extensive gallery of his work can be viewed online at  The official website of Carl Brenders

References

1937 births
Living people
Bird artists